Gazelle Valley (translit: Emek Hatzva'im), previously known as the Pri Har Valley, is an open space of 260 dunams (64.25 acres) in the heart of Jerusalem, Israel, on the edge of the Givat Mordechai neighborhood, opposite the busy Patt Intersection.

History

Gazelle Valley is named for a herd of about 55 gazelles of the subspecies Gazella gazella gazella that live in this area, bounded by urban development. Real estate developers have sought building rights in the area, but the Society for the Protection of Nature in Israel (SPNI) and local activists have fought to preserve the natural surroundings. After lengthy court battles, the Jerusalem Municipality has drawn up plans to turn the area into a public park and nature reserve. The Jerusalem Development Authority pledged  in funding toward the park.

In January 2013, work began on the park, which is described as Israel’s first urban nature reserve, which opened in March 2015.

The Gazelle Valley has become one of the best and most accessible places to see a variety of wildlife in their natural behavior. Several endangered species other than Gazelles live in the Gazelle Valley, as a result of the opening of a small pond in the middle of the valley.  

Gazelle Valley website

See also
Wildlife in Israel
Tourism in Israel
 Wildlife corridor

References

Geography of Jerusalem
Parks in Jerusalem
Urban wildlife